Smažený sýr or vyprážaný syr – both meaning "fried cheese" – is a Czech and Slovak cheese-based dish that is widely consumed in both countries of the former state of Czechoslovakia. It is a common street food in both countries and is popular among students as an inexpensive staple in school canteens.

It is typically served with tartar sauce or mayonnaise, and is often served accompanied by bread, potatoes (fries or boiled potatoes).

It is similar to the Italian Mozzarella in Carrozza. The dish may also be prepared with a thin slice of ham inserted between two slices of cheese, and in Czech fast food outlets it is often served in the form of a sandwich – in something similar to a hamburger bun.

See also 
 Fried cheese
 List of street foods

References

Cheese dishes
Czech cuisine
Deep fried foods
Slovak cheeses
Slovak cuisine
Street food